Donsö is a small island in the Southern Göteborg Archipelago and a locality situated in Göteborg Municipality, Västra Götaland County, Sweden. It had 1,407 inhabitants in 2010. The local covenant church on Donsö has approximately 500 members.

Sports
The following sports clubs are located in Donsö:

 Donsö IS

Shipping
Donsö has a long history of shipping, especially in tanker businesses. The following companies are located or owned by people living on Donsö.
 
Donsötank
Furetank
Veritas Tankers
Sirius Rederi
Swedia Rederi
Tärntank
Älvtank
GotShip (OljOla)
Donsö Bunker Service
Kiltank Rederi AB
BunkerTell Rederi
Northern Offshore Services

Neighboring inhabited Islands
Styrsö, Vrångö, Sjumansholmen

References 

Populated places in Västra Götaland County
Populated places in Gothenburg Municipality
Southern Gothenburg Archipelago
Islands of Västra Götaland County